Events in the year 1957 in Germany.

Events 
 27 February - Germany in the Eurovision Song Contest 1957
 12 April - Göttingen Manifesto
 21 June - 2 July - 7th Berlin International Film Festival
 1 August - The Deutsche Bundesbank was established.
 15 September - West German federal election, 1957
 29 October The Third Adenauer cabinet led by Konrad Adenauer was sworn in.

Full date unknown 
 The Balda Baldessa 35 mm film camera debuts.

Births 

 8 February - Imogen Kogge, Germa actor	
 18 February - Marita Koch, German athlete
 8 March - Axel A. Weber, German economist, professor and banker
 10 March - Hans-Peter Friedrich, German politician
 14 March - Kai Krause, German computer scientist	
 18 May - Frank Plasberg, German journalist	
 24 May - Walter Moers, German comic creator and author	
 31 May - Ilse Junkermann, German bishop of the Evangelical Church in Central Germany	
17 June - Joachim Król, German actor	
 5 July - Carlo Thränhardt, German high jumper	
 12 July - Götz Alsmann, German television presenter and musician
 29 July - Ulrich Tukur, German actor
 4 August  Olaf Beyer, German athlete	
 18 August - Harald Schmidt, German actor, writer, columnist, comedian and television entertainer
 26 August - Christian Schmidt, German politician
 27 August - Bernhard Langer, German golfer
 8 September - Christoph Eichhorn, German actor
 10 September - Matthias Brenner, German actor
 26 November - Matthias Reim, German singer
 12 September - Hans Zimmer, German composer
 20 September - Sabine Christiansen, German journalist
 23 September - Suzanne von Borsody, German actress
 29 September - Harald Schmid, German track and field athlete
 21 October - Wolfgang Ketterle, German physicist
 10 November - Ingo Metzmacher, German conductor
 8 December - Hannelore Anke, German swimmer
 12 December - Tom Gerhardt, German actor and comedian
 29 December - Oliver Hirschbiegel, German film director
 30 December - Johann Riederer, German sport shooter

Full date unknown 
Monika Maid, singer/songwriter

Deaths

January 1 - Hans Wölpert, German weightlifter (born 1898)
January 22 - Claire Waldoff, German singer (born 1884)	
January 31 - Christian Hülsmeyer, German inventor, physicist and entrepreneur (born 1881)
February 1 - Friedrich Paulus, German field marshal (born 1890)
February 8 - Walther Bothe, German physicist (born 1891)
February 13 - Gustav Mie, German physicist (born 1868)
February 14 - Erich Ponto, German actor (born 1884)
March 26 - Max Ophüls, German film director (born 1902)	
May 7 - Wilhelm Filchner, German explorer (born 1877)
May 10 - Kurt von Tippelskirch, German general (born 1891)	
May 15 - Karl Friedrich Bonhoeffer, chemist (born 1899)
June 4 – Louise Schroeder, German politician (born 1887)
June 21 - Johannes Stark, German chemist Nobel Prize laureate (born 1874)
June 26 - Alfred Döblin, German  novelist, essayist and writer (born 1878)
August 5 - Heinrich Otto Wieland, German chemist, Nobel Prize in Chemistry (born 1877)
August 30 - Otto Suhr, German politician (born 1894)
October 28 - Ernst Gräfenberg, physician (medical doctor) and scientist (born 1881)
October 29 - Rosemarie Nitribitt. German luxury call girl (born 1933)
December 9 - Otto Landsberg, German politician (born 1869)
December 27 - Otto Nuschke, German politician (born 1883)

See also

 1957 in German television

References

 
1950s in Germany
Years of the 20th century in Germany
Germany
Germany